Counce is a surname. Notable people with the surname include:

Curtis Counce (1926–1963), American jazz double bassist
Dan Counce (born 1951), American soccer player and executive